Since table tennis was introduced to the Summer Olympics in 1988, only 38 table tennis players have represented China at the event. By contrast, at least 124 Chinese-born players have competed for other countries and territories. Table tennis is the only Olympic sport with over 30% of players representing an adopted country (more than double the rate for all other sports), and the vast majority hail from China. This list includes Hong Kong players from mainland China but not foreign-born players of Chinese descent (e.g. the entire 2012 U.S. team: Timothy Wang, Ariel Hsing, Erica Wu and Lily Zhang), with the exception of Hui So Hung who was born in Indonesia but was already a Chinese citizen when she emigrated to British Hong Kong in 1978.

Male players

Female players

See also
 List of table tennis players

References

Table tennis
Chinese diaspora